The London Labour Party mayoral selection of 2015 was the process by which the Labour Party selected its candidate for Mayor of London, to stand in the mayoral election on 5 May 2016. It was the first Mayoral selection process since 2002 not to feature Ken Livingstone as a candidate.

Timetable
13 May 2015: Applications opened
20 May 2015 (12:00): Applications closed, Constituency Labour Party (CLP) nominations opened
10 June 2015: CLP nominations closed
12 June 2015: Selection Committee determines short-list
13 June 2015: Short-list announced
17 June 2015: First hustings, held in Camden
21 June 2015: Second hustings, held in Stratford
15 July 2015: Third hustings, held in Ealing
24 July 2015: Fourth hustings, held in Hornsey & Wood Green
30 July 2015: Final hustings, held in Southwark
12 August 2015 (12:00): Last date to join as an affiliated support or registered supporter of the Labour Party in London and be eligible to vote
14 August 2015: Ballot papers dispatched
10 September 2015 (12:00): Ballot closes
11 September 2015: Results announced

Candidates

CLP nominations
To proceed in the Labour selection process, each applicant had to secure the nomination of at least five Constituency Labour Parties (CLPs) in the London region. There are 73 CLPs in London, and each CLP could make up to two nominations. The first nomination was required to be for one of the female candidates, and the second nomination could be for any candidate. Nominations were decided at open meetings of local parties, with all Labour members and registered/affiliated supporters within that CLP eligible to vote in person.

The results were as follows:

Keran Kerai and Neeraj Patil received no CLP nominations and were therefore eliminated from the contest. All six other applicants received enough nominations to go forward.

Announced
Nominated

Eliminated
 Keran Kerai, writer based in Harrow
Neeraj Patil, former Mayor of Lambeth (2010–2011) and Lambeth Borough Councillor for Larkhall Ward (2006–2014)

Declined
The following candidates considered running or were mentioned as possible candidates, but ultimately did not put themselves forward for selection.
 Andrew Adonis, Baron Adonis, Shadow Infrastructure Minister and former Secretary of State for Transport
 Margaret Hodge, Chair of the Public Accounts Committee and MP for Barking
 Eddie Izzard, comedian, actor and writer
 Alan Johnson, former Home Secretary and MP for Kingston upon Hull West
 Oona King, former MP for Bethnal Green and Bow and candidate for Mayor in 2012
 Doreen Lawrence, campaigner and mother of Stephen Lawrence
 Ken Livingstone, former Mayor of London
 Sir Robin Wales, Mayor of Newham

Opinion polling

Results

Between 14 August and 10 September, affiliated and registered supporters and members of the Labour Party in London were able to vote.

See also
 Greater Manchester Labour Party mayoral selection, 2016
 London Conservative Party mayoral selection, 2015

References

External links
London Labour Party website

London Labour Party
Politics of London
Mayoral elections in London
Labour Party London mayoral selection
Labour Party London mayoral selection